Simon Luhrs (born 18 June 1970) is a former Australian rules footballer who played with the Brisbane Bears in the Australian Football League (AFL).

Luhrs, a zone selection in the 1989 VFL Draft, was a member of the Queensland team which defeated Victoria in 1991. Towards the end of the 1991 AFL season he broke into the seniors for the first time and was also a full-back in the reserves premiership team.  While primarily a key defender, Luhrs was also used as a ruckman on occasions.

After leaving Brisbane he began playing for Central District in the SANFL. He got his second chance to play AFL football when he was picked up by Hawthorn in the 1994 Mid-season Draft. Luhrs however didn't play a senior game for Hawthorn and finished his career at Central District.

References

External links
 

1970 births
Australian rules footballers from Queensland
Brisbane Bears players
Western Magpies Australian Football Club players
Central District Football Club players
Living people